Yenihayat can refer to:

 Yenihayat, Çorum
 Yenihayat Dam